Víctor Hugo Cabrera Sánchez (born 9 November 1957) is a Chilean former footballer.

He has been one of the most prolific goalscorers in Chilean football history.

International career
He was part of a Chile squad which was called Selección Joven (young squad), with Luis Santibáñez as the team coach, that was preparing for the 1982 FIFA World Cup.

Personal life
He is better known by his nickname Pititore: a fusion between Pituco, a Chilean way of referring to people from the aristocracy, and Cantatore, the surname of the football coach Vicente, who was well-known at the time. The nickname was born when Cabrera worked as a cleaner for wealthy women – "viejas pitucas" according to him – and used to sing (cantar in Spanish), turning the word cantar into Cantatore.

Honours

Club
San Luis Quillota
 Copa Apertura: 1980

Colo-Colo
 Copa Chile: 1985

Individual
 Primera División de Chile Top-Scorer (2): 1981, 1984

References

1957 births
Living people
People from Valparaíso Province
Chilean footballers
Chile international footballers
San Luis de Quillota footballers
Everton de Viña del Mar footballers
Regional Atacama footballers
Colo-Colo footballers
Deportes Concepción (Chile) footballers
Deportes La Serena footballers
Unión La Calera footballers
Chilean Primera División players
Primera B de Chile players
Association football forwards